Tejturi Bazar is name of a neighborhood in Tejgaon, Dhaka.  It's divided by east tejturi Bazar & west Tejturi Bazar. It situated both side of KAZI Nazrul Ave. It's densely populated and situated in the heart of the city.

References

Neighbourhoods in Dhaka
Bazaars in Bangladesh